Konstantinos "Costis" Gontikas (alternate spellings: Constantinos, Kostas, Costas, Kostis, Godikas) (Greek: Κωνσταντίνος "Κώστας" Γόντικας; born March 15, 1994) is a Greek professional basketball player for AEK Athens of the Greek Basket League and the Basketball Champions League. He is a 2.06 m (6'9") tall center.

High school
Gontikas played high school basketball at the Athens College, in Psychiko, Athens, Greece.

College career
Gontikas played college basketball in the NCAA Division III, at NYU, with the NYU Violets, from 2012 to 2016.

Professional career
Gontikas began his professional career in 2016, with the Greek Basket League club Panathinaikos. He made his Greek Basket League debut on 13 November 2016, in an 80–65 win against Kolossos. He was released from Panathinaikos on June 20, 2017. In August 2017, he agreed terms with Apollon Patras.

On June 26, 2018, he joined Ifaistos Limnou of the Greek Basket League.

On July 18, 2019, Gontikas signed a three-year contract with Peristeri. On July 31, 2020, Gontikas terminated his contract with Peristeri and signed a one-year deal with AEK Athens.

On August 16, 2021, Gontikas moved to Ionikos Nikaias. In 15 games, he averaged 9.1 points and 5.9 rebounds per contest. On March 22, 2022, Gontikas moved to Romanian club U FC Argeș Pitești for the rest of the season.

Gontikas started out the 2022-2023 season with Karditsa, but on January 20, 2023, he signed back with AEK Athens for the rest of the season.

National team career
Gontikas played with the junior national teams of Greece. With Greece's junior national teams, he played at the 2012 FIBA Europe Under-18 Championship and the 2013 FIBA Europe Under-20 Championship.

Honours
Greek League Champion: 2017
Greek Cup Winner: (2017)

Personal life
His father Dimitris is a former international volleyball player. His grandfather is the Greek politician Kostis Gontikas.

References

External links
FIBA Archive Profile
FIBA Europe Profile
Euroleague.net Profile
Eurobasket.com Profile
Greek Basket League Profile 
Greek Basket League Profile 
BG Basket Profile
Panathinaikos Profile
NYU College Bio
Twitter

1994 births
Living people
AEK B.C. players
ASK Karditsas B.C. players
Apollon Patras B.C. players
Centers (basketball)
Greek men's basketball players
Greek expatriate basketball people in Romania
Greek expatriate basketball people in the United States
Ifaistos Limnou B.C. players
Ionikos Nikaias B.C. players
NYU Violets men's basketball players
Panathinaikos B.C. players
Peristeri B.C. players
Basketball players from Athens